Callichimaera perplexa is a species of small crabs known from the Cretaceous  Churuvita Group of Colombia and the Frontier Formation of the United States. Because it possesses a strange combination of anatomical features, it is said to be the "platypus of crabs". The presence of certain features in this species, such as its large claws and swimming limbs, confirm that those features were present in the crab lineage up to 95 million years ago. It evolved during the Cretaceous crab revolution.

Etymology

The generic name Callichimaera is derived from the Ancient Greek prefix "calli-" (kalós), meaning beautiful, and "chimaera" (chímaira), meaning a composite mythological animal, a reference to the bizarre forms and characteristics of this species. The specific name is derived from the Latin "perplexus", meaning intricate (or perplexing in that manner), a reference to the complex anatomical affinities this species displays.

Description
Callichimaera possesses features that are commonly associated with the larval crab stage called the megalopa. This includes features like large compound eyes, a small fusiform body, and thin mouth parts. However, the fossil crabs also show evidence of sexual maturity, suggesting they are adult forms. This species likely evolved those larval features via a process called heterochrony.

These crabs were small, with many that are nearly the size of a U.S. quarter. The crabs range in size from a few millimeters up to two centimeters, also suggesting that both juveniles and adults are present.

Callichimaera does not have the typical crab-like shape, something that has occurred several times among crabs since the Cretaceous.

Because Callichimaera has large paddle-like legs, it was probably an active swimmer, opposed to predominantly living on the seafloor.

Paleoecology
Callichimaera lived in a tropical environment. Fossils are rarely preserved in tropical settings in comparison to other parts of the world, making this fossil an even more unusual discovery. An in-depth study of the crab's eyes indicated that Callichimaera was an active predator living high in the water column.

Callichimaera was discovered in deposits also containing comma shrimp and caridean shrimp.

References

Crabs
Late Cretaceous crustaceans
Late Cretaceous animals of South America
Late Cretaceous animals of North America
Cretaceous arthropods of North America
Fossil taxa described in 2019
Fossils of Colombia
Cretaceous Colombia
Cretaceous United States
Fossils of the United States
Cretaceous arthropods of South America